Star Licks Productions (also known as StarLicks) was an instructional music publishing company conceived by Mark Freed and co-founded by Andrew Cross and Robert Decker. The company was at the forefront of creating instructional videos featuring well-known musicians demonstrating their unique musical styles and techniques on-camera.

In 1984, the company's video portfolio debuted with a wide-ranging group of musicians including: Brian May of Queen, Steve Lukather of Toto, Tony Iommi of Black Sabbath, Al McKay of  Earth, Wind & Fire, Carlos Cavazo of Quiet Riot, Louis Johnson of The Brothers Johnson, noted country guitarist, Albert Lee, and acclaimed guitarist/educator Wolf Marshall."

Other notable artists (Alphabetized)

Michael Angelo Batio
Jeff Berlin
Jason Bonham of Bonham
Larry Carlton
Randy Castillo of Ozzy Osbourne and Mötley Crüe
Nathan East
Blas Elias of Slaughter
Rik Emmett of Triumph
Ray Flacke
Flea of Red Hot Chili Peppers
Brad Gillis of Night Ranger
Ray Gomez
Larry Graham
Jim Hall
Ray Hitchins
James Jamerson, Jr.
Robert Johnson
Davey Johnstone of Elton John 
Stanley Jordan
John Jorgenson
Abe Laboriel
Bruce Lowe
Tony MacAlpine
Michael Manring
Chet McCracken
Byron Miller
Dave Navarro
Ted Nugent
Les Paul
Jeff Porcaro of Toto
Steve Porcaro of Toto
Trevor Rabin of Yes
Chuck Rainey
Rowan Robertson
Mark Slaughter of Slaughter
Phil Soussan
Chris Squire of Yes
Dana Strum
Neil Stubenhaus
Chester Thompson
Joe Walsh of The Eagles
Freddie Washington
Jeff Watson of Night Ranger
Verdine White of Earth, Wind & Fire
Mark Whitfield
Nancy Wilson of Heart
Simon Wright of AC/DC and Dio

References

External links
Hal Leonard Music Publishing
Products and Artist synopsis at MSN Entertainment
Star Licks at YouTube

Music publishing companies of the United States
Publishing companies established in 1982
Music education organizations
1982 establishments in California
American companies established in 1982
Companies based in Santa Monica, California